Baddoke Cheema is a village of Sialkot District in the Punjab province of Pakistan. It is located nearly 10 km away from Daska. It is a Union Council of Sambrial Tehsil, and previously it was part of Daska Tehsil. The creek Aaik passes north of this village. The village has one hospital. There are two high schools one for boys and one for girls.

References

Villages in Sialkot District